O Rappa is the first album by Brazilian band O Rappa. It was produced by Fábio Henriques and O Rappa. It is distributed through Warner Music.

Track listing
"Catequeses Do Medo" - 3:56
"Não Vão Me Matar" - 5:17
"Todo Camburão Tem Um Pouco De Navio Negreiro" - 4:36
"Take It Easy My Brother Charles" – 4:06
"Brixton, Bronx Ou Baixada" – 4:47
"R.A.M." - 4:16
"Skunk Jammin'" - 0:34
"Coincidências E Paixões" - 4:38
"Fogo Cruzado" - 4:36
"À Noite" - 3:16
"Candidato Caô Caô" - 4:51
"Mitologia Gerimum" - 4:16
"Sujo" - 4:13
"Sujo - Dub" - 4:16
"Todo Camburão Tem Um Pouco De Navio Negreiro - Dub" - 4:30
"Vinheta Da Silva" - 0:25

Personnel 
Marcelo Falcão – Voz
Alexandre Menezes (Xandão) – Guitarra
Nelson Meirelles – Baixo
Marcelo Lobato - Teclados, Sampler e Vocais
Marcelo Yuka – Bateria
Dj Cléston - Scratch em "Coincidências e Paixões"
Marcos Suzano - Percussão
Baxter - Congas
Chico Amaral - Sax Tenor
Paulo Marcio - Trompete
Pedro Aristides - Trombone
Bezerra da Silva - Voz em "Candidato Caô Caô"
Fábio Henriques – Produção

References

O Rappa albums
1994 albums